Spring House is a historic inn located at Barryville in Sullivan County, New York.  It was built as a residence about 1880 and almost immediately enlarged as a hotel and boarding house.  The original house is the 2-story main block with gable roof, a small south gable-roofed wing, and a two-by-two-bay rear wing.  Long narrow wings were added shortly after the original construction.  It is now configured as a long, narrow, rectangular building, two stories tall, eleven bays wide and two bays wide with a -story cross-gabled center section.

It was added to the National Register of Historic Places in 2009.

References

Hotel buildings on the National Register of Historic Places in New York (state)
Houses in Sullivan County, New York
National Register of Historic Places in Sullivan County, New York